Ardisia is a large, broadly distributed genus of flowering shrubs, trees and woody herbs in the primrose family, Primulaceae. , there are over 700 accepted species in Kew's Plants of the World Online.

References

L
Ardisia